William James Patterson (February 7, 1838 – November 6, 1926) was the Commander-in-Chief of the Grand Army of the Republic from 1916 to 1917.

Biography
He was born in Ireland on February 7, 1838. By 1860 he had migrated to the United States. He served in the American Civil War and was wounded and captured at the Battle of Gaines's Mill. He served as the Pennsylvania's Department Commander of the Grand Army of the Republic from 1898 to 1899. In May 1913 he was named to an eight-member commission to plan the 50th anniversary commemoration of the Battle of Gettysburg. He was the Commander-in-Chief of the Grand Army of the Republic from 1916 to 1917. He died on November 6, 1926.

References

1838 births
1926 deaths
People of Pennsylvania in the American Civil War
Grand Army of the Republic Commanders-in-Chief
Irish emigrants to the United States (before 1923)